DCM may refer to:

Science and technology
 Dichloromethane, a common solvent in organic chemistry
 Deep chlorophyll maximum, subsurface maximum in the concentration of chlorophyll
 Dynamic causal modelling, a method for the interpretation of functional neuroimaging data
 Docking Cargo Module, A Russian module of the International Space Station
 Dilated cardiomyopathy, a heart condition

Computing
 Digital clock manager, in field-programmable gate arrays
 .dcm, a filename extension for Digital Imaging and Communications in Medicine  
 Desired Configuration Management, in Microsoft's System Center Configuration Manager

Organisations
 DCM textiles, formerly Delhi Cloth & General Mills
 DCM Ventures, a venture capital company
 Digital Cinema Media, an advertising company
NTT DoCoMo (NYSE symbol), a mobile phone operator in Japan
 Doll Capital Management, a US venture capital firm which funded SandForce, BitTorrent and others
 Dunbee-Combex-Marx, a former British toy manufacturer which purchased Lines Bros and Schuco Modell
 DoubleClick Campaign Manager, online ad management and ad serving solution.

Other uses
 IATA code for Castres–Mazamet Airport, an airport in France
 Demand Chain Management
 Deputy Chief of Mission
 Director of Civilian Marksmanship, by U.S. Civilian Marksmanship Program
 Distinguished Conduct Medal, British and Commonwealth medal for extreme bravery